Charles Graham Drinkwater (February 22, 1875 – September 27, 1946) was a Canadian ice hockey player, businessman and philanthropist. Drinkwater played for the Montreal Victorias in the Amateur Hockey Association of Canada (AHAC) in the early era before professionalism. He had the ability to play both forward and defence with equal skill. Drinkwater was a member of five Stanley Cup winning teams during his career. He was elected to the Hockey Hall of Fame in 1950. After hockey, Drinkwater became a partner in a stock-broker business and a supporter of several orchestras in Montreal.

Early life 
Drinkwater was born and raised in Montreal, Quebec. He was educated at the High School of Montreal and McGill University. Drinkwater was an accomplished hockey and rugby football player in his teens. He starred with the Montreal Hockey Club junior team in 1892–93, the same year, the senior team won the first Stanley Cup. Drinkwater also played a prominent role on McGill's football team.

Hockey career 
After graduating from McGill in 1895, Drinkwater joined the Victoria Hockey Club of Montreal. He scored nine goals in eight contests, helping the Victorias win the Stanley Cup. Drinkwater would also win the Cup in 1896, 1897, 1898 and 1899 (as Captain). His excellent skating made him one of the best players early in the game of hockey.

After retiring as a player, Drinkwater continued in the game as referee. He was named one of the original trustees of the Allan Cup by donator H. Montagu Allan in 1909. Drinkwater was inducted to the Hockey Hall of Fame in 1950.

Business and music involvement
Drinkwater became a stock-broker and rose to partner of the firm Oswald & Drinkwater, later to become Drinkwater Weir & Company. Along with his wife Muriel Greenshields, he became a supporter of music in the city. He was the organizer of a February 11, 1934 benefit concert of the then Montreal Orchestra that cleared all of its debts and provided a surplus for future efforts. Drinkwater was vice-president of the Orchestra until it suspended in 1941.  He continued supporting music as a director of Les Concerts Symphoniques (later known as the Montreal Symphony Orchestra) and a supporter of the Montreal Little Symphony until his death in 1946 at his home at 3511 Peel Street in Montreal. He was survived by his wife, a brother and a sister.

Hockey statistics

* Stanley Cup Champion.

References 
 
Notes

Kings of the Ice

External links
 

1875 births
1946 deaths
Canadian ice hockey forwards
High School of Montreal alumni
Hockey Hall of Fame inductees
Ice hockey people from Montreal
McGill University alumni
Montreal Victorias players
Stanley Cup champions